Preventive Medicine is a peer-reviewed medical journal published by Elsevier since 1972. It covers all aspects of preventive medicine and public health. The editor-in-chief is Eduardo L. Franco (McGill University). The founding editor was Ernst Wynder.

Abstracting and indexing 
The journal is abstracted and indexed in EMBASE, Scopus, Science Citation Index, Current Contents/Clinical Medicine, BIOSIS Previews, and Index Medicus/MEDLINE/PubMed. Its 2014 impact factor was 3.086, ranking it 25th among 153 journals in the category "General and Internal Medicine" and 31st among 162 journals in the category "Public, Environmental, and Occupational Health".

References

External links 

 

Public health journals
Elsevier academic journals
Monthly journals
Publications established in 1972
English-language journals
Preventive medicine journals